The 1963 World Table Tennis Championships were held in Prague from April 5 to April 14, 1963.

Medalists

Team

Individual

References

External links
ITTF Museum

 
World Table Tennis Championships
World Table Tennis Championships
World Table Tennis Championships
Table tennis competitions in Czechoslovakia
International sports competitions hosted by Czechoslovakia
Sports competitions in Prague
April 1963 sports events in Europe
1960s in Prague